KTDZ (103.9 FM, "Ted FM") is a commercial radio station in College, Alaska, broadcasting to the Fairbanks, Alaska, area.  KTDZ airs an adult hits format.

External links
 KTDZ website
 

TDZ
Adult hits radio stations in the United States
Radio stations established in 1983